The Scream the Prayer Tour, also known as Scream the Prayer, or simply STP, was an American Christian metalcore/hardcore music worship tour, presented by INRI Clothing. The tour had been held annually since it began, in mid-2008. In 2013 promoters decided it would be the final tour due to low ticket sales and lack of audience.

2008 
The line up for the first 2008 tour included Impending Doom, Sleeping Giant, MyChildren MyBride, War of Ages, Before Their Eyes, Blessed by a Broken Heart, Haste the Day, With Blood Comes Cleansing, Here I Come Falling, Akissforjersey, Agraceful,  and Soul Embraced.

2009 
The line up for the 2009 tour included Haste the Day,  The Chariot, Sleeping Giant, Project 86, Oh, Sleeper, Gwen Stacy, Agraceful, For Today, A Plea for Purging, and Corpus Christi.

2010 
The lineup for the 2010 tour included Maylene and the Sons of Disaster, For Today, Blessed by a Broken Heart, A Plea for Purging, The Color Morale, The Crimson Armada, I the Breather, The Great Commission, In the Midst of Lions, and Hundredth. The tour dates were announced below. This year marked the third annual tour.

2011
The lineup for the 2011 tour includes Norma Jean, Sleeping Giant, The Chariot, War of Ages, Close Your Eyes, Texas In July, I The Breather, The Great Commission, As Hell Retreats, and Sovereign Strength. The tour dates were announced below. This year marks the fourth annual tour.

2012
The lineup for the 2012 tour includes Demon Hunter (selective dates), Emery, Sleeping Giant, MyChildren MyBride, Close Your Eyes, Hundredth, The Great Commission, Gideon, A Bullet for Pretty Boy, Your Memorial, and To Speak of Wolves (selective dates). The tour dates are announced below. This year marks the fifth annual tour.

2013
The lineup for the 2013 tour includes Impending Doom, Gideon, Wolves at the Gate, Fit For a King, The Great Commission, Everyone Dies in Utah, The Overseer, Those Who Fear, and Silent Planet. The tour dates have been announced below. This year marks the sixth annual tour.

References

External links
 Scream the Prayer Tour on Twitter
 Interview with STP 2011 Bands on HighWire Daze

2008 concert tours
2009 concert tours
2010 concert tours
2011 concert tours
2012 concert tours
2013 concert tours
Christian music festivals
Christian hardcore
Christian metal